The 1989–90 New York Islanders season was the 18th season for the franchise in the National Hockey League (NHL). The team finished 31–38–11, returning to the Stanley Cup playoffs after a one-year absence, but losing to their rivals the New York Rangers in the first round, four games to one.

Offseason

Regular season
The Islanders finished the regular season with the fewest power-play opportunities of all 21 teams in the league with just 330. They also tied the Boston Bruins for most shutouts in the NHL, with 5.

Final standings

Schedule and results

Playoffs

|- style="background:#fcf;"
| 1 || April 5 || NY Islanders || 1–2 || NY Rangers ||  || 0-1
|- style="background:#fcf;"
| 2 || April 7 || NY Islanders || 2–5 || NY Rangers ||  || 0-2
|- style="background:#cfc;"
| 3 || April 9 || NY Rangers || 3–4 || NY Islanders || 2OT || 1-2
|- style="background:#fcf;"
| 4 || April 11 || NY Rangers || 6–1 || NY Islanders ||  || 1-3
|- style="background:#fcf;"
| 5 || April 13 || NY Islanders || 5–6 || NY Rangers ||  || 1-4
|-

|-
| Legend:       = Win       = Loss       = Playoff series win

Player statistics

Note: Pos = Position; GP = Games played; G = Goals; A = Assists; Pts = Points; +/- = plus/minus; PIM = Penalty minutes; PPG = Power-play goals; SHG = Short-handed goals; GWG = Game-winning goals
      MIN = Minutes played; W = Wins; L = Losses; T = Ties; GA = Goals-against; GAA = Goals-against average; SO = Shutouts; SA = Shots against; SV = Shots saved; SV% = Save percentage;

Awards and records

Transactions

Draft picks
New York's draft picks at the 1989 NHL Entry Draft held at the Met Center in Bloomington, Minnesota.

Farm teams

See also
 1989–90 NHL season

References

External links

New York Islanders seasons
New York Islanders
New York Islanders
New York Islanders
New York Islanders